is a Japanese judoka. She competed in the women's half-middleweight event at the 1992 Summer Olympics.

References

External links
 

1968 births
Living people
Japanese female judoka
Olympic judoka of Japan
Judoka at the 1992 Summer Olympics
Sportspeople from Kyoto
Judoka at the 1990 Asian Games
Asian Games medalists in judo
Asian Games silver medalists for Japan
Medalists at the 1990 Asian Games
20th-century Japanese women
21st-century Japanese women